Ari-Pekka Selin (born May 17, 1963) is a former professional ice hockey player and coach.  During the 2013–2014 season, he coached both  Barys Astana of the Kontinental Hockey League (KHL) and the Kazakhstan men's national ice hockey team.

He was hired to be the Barys' head coach on June 4, 2013, replacing Vladimir Krikunov. On June 11, 2014, he was relieved as coach of the Kazakh National Team. It was reported a week later that he had been replaced as coach of Barys by Andrei Nazarov.

He previously served as the head coach of SaPKo Savonlinna, Ilves Tampere, SaiPa Lappeenranta and HPK Hämeenlinna.

Coaching career
1995–1999  SaPKo Savonlinna - head coach
1999–2001  Ilves Tampere - assistant coach
2001–2003  Ilves Tampere - head coach
2003–2005  SaPKo Savonlinna - head coach
2005–2007  SaiPa Lappeenranta - assistant coach
2007–2012  SaiPa Lappeenranta - head coach
2012–2013  Finland men's national ice hockey team - assistant coach
2012–2013  HPK Hämeenlinna - head coach
2013–2014  Kazakhstan men's national ice hockey team - head coach
2013–2014  Barys Astana - head coach
2015–2017  TPS Turku - head coach
2017–2019  HIFK Helsinki - head coach
2019–2021  Ässät Pori - head coach (replaced by Karri Kivi during the 2021–22 season)

Coaching record

References

External links

 

1963 births
Barys Astana head coaches
Ässät coaches
Finnish ice hockey coaches
Finnish ice hockey defencemen
Kazakhstan men's national ice hockey team coaches
Living people
SaPKo players
Sportspeople from Pori